Taiping Township is a township in Mishan, Jixi, Heilongjiang, China. , it has eight villages under its administration:
Taiping Village
Qingsong Village
Nongfeng Village
Minzhu Village
Honglin Village
Zhuangnei Village
Hexin Village
Zhuangxing Village

References 

Township-level divisions of Heilongjiang
Mishan